is a former professional tennis player.

In her career, she won four singles titles on the WTA Tour. Sawamatsu reached a career-high ranking of world No. 14, on 6 February 1995. At the time of the 1995 Australian Open, her family survived the Great Hanshin earthquake, and Sawamatsu went on to achieve her best Grand Slam result at Melbourne Park, reaching the quarterfinals by defeating compatriot Ai Sugiyama, Laurence Courtois, Kimiko Date in the third round, Mary Joe Fernandez in the fourth round before losing to Arantxa Sánchez Vicario.

Her most significant title came in 1993 at Strasbourg, when she defeated clay-courter Judith Wiesner in the final. Sawamatsu had much success at Strasbourg reaching the semifinals in 1991, final in 1992 losing to Judith Wiesner.

She retired from professional tennis after losing in the second round of the 1998 Japan Open to Monica Seles in a three-set match. Sawamatsu had wins over the following players during her career: Martina Hingis, Lindsay Davenport, Kimiko Date, Mary Joe Fernandez, Amanda Coetzer, and Conchita Martínez. She was the first player to be beaten by Venus Williams in the main draw of a Grand Slam tournament, at the French Open in 1997.

Sawamatsu's has a career win–loss record in singles of 205–143.

Since retirement, she has been involved in the development of sport in her native country.
Sawamatsu is the daughter of tennis player Junko Sawamatsu and the niece of 1975 Wimbledon ladies doubles champion Kazuko Sawamatsu.

WTA career finals

Singles: 7 (4 titles, 3 runner-ups)

ITF Circuit finals

Singles: 2 (2–0)

Doubles: 1 (0–1)

Performance timeline

References

External links
 
 
 

1973 births
Living people
Japanese female tennis players
Olympic tennis players of Japan
People from Nishinomiya
Sportspeople from Hyōgo Prefecture
Tennis players at the 1992 Summer Olympics
Asian Games medalists in tennis
Tennis players at the 1990 Asian Games
Tennis players at the 1994 Asian Games
Medalists at the 1990 Asian Games
Medalists at the 1994 Asian Games
Asian Games gold medalists for Japan
Asian Games silver medalists for Japan
20th-century Japanese women